Malagawatch 4 is a Mi'kmaq reserve located in Inverness County, Nova Scotia.

It is administered jointly by the following First Nations governments, each of which is responsible for 1/5 of the territory and inhabitants:

 Waycobah First Nation
 Wagmatcook First Nation
 Membertou First Nation
 Eskasoni First Nation
 Potlotek First Nation

Indian reserves in Nova Scotia
Communities in Inverness County, Nova Scotia
Mi'kmaq in Canada